Richard Stuttaford (13 June 1870 – 19 October 1945) was a South African businessman and parliamentarian.

Life and work 

Stuttaford was the son of Samson Rickard Stuttaford, the founder of the Stuttafords department store chain. He was educated in England and France and joined the firm Thorne, Stuttaford & Co. in 1892, which his father co-founded with Sir William Thorne. He became the head of the company in 1917.

Stuttaford was a member of the Cape Town City Council and the Cape Town Chamber of Commerce, holding the position of the chairman of the latter from 1918 until 1920). He was the chairman of the Association of Chambers of Commerce of South Africa from 1921 until 1923.

Stuttaford was not initially interested in public affairs, but at the age of 54, he was elected to the Union Assembly as the representative from Newlands, against the Constitutional Democrat, C.A. Lagesen.  In 1929 he was elected unopposed from the same constituency and in 1933 he was again re-elected unopposed, but this time as South African Party coalition candidate from Claremont after Newlands was dissolved because of redemarcation.  In 1938 he won as a candidate of the United Party in Claremont against E.M.O. Clough from the Dominion Party.

His knowledge of commerce was useful in the Union Assembly, and Jan Smuts invited him to participate in negotiations with British commercial authorities in Ottawa. He served as a minister without portfolio from 1933 until 1936. Between 1936 and 1939 he was the minister of social welfare, and from 1939 until 1942, the minister of trade and industry in Smuts' war cabinet.

Stuttaford founded a garden village named Pinelands near Cape Town in 1920, which is now a suburb of Cape Town.

Stuttaford's Department Store, in Cape Town, was designed by the Scottish architect, Louis David Blanc (Harrod's in-house architect) in 1938.

Stuttaford died in Stellenbosch in 1945.

References 

 Potgieter, D.J. (red.) 1972. Standard Encyclopaedia of Southern Africa. Cape Town: Nasionale Opvoedkundige Uitgewery (Nasou).
 Rosenthal, Eric. 1978. Encyclopaedia of Southern Africa. Cape Town and Johannesburg: Juta and Company Limited.

1870 births
1945 deaths
South African politicians
Politicians from Cape Town